Celtophile Records was a Danbury, Connecticut-based sublabel of Green Linnet Records that specialized in budget compilations of Celtic music. The label was started in 1997 in Danbury, Connecticut by Green Linnet owner Wendy Newton.  It operated until 2006, when Newton sold Green Linnet to Digital Music Group, an aggregator of downloadable music.  DMG in turn sold the rights to manufacture and distribute Green Linnet to Compass Records, which still markets the Green Linnet catalog.

See also 
 Compass Records
 Green Linnet Records
 List of record labels

References

Record labels established in 1997
American independent record labels